Qadirabad is a village located near Chenab River in tehsil Phalia in Mandi Bahauddin District in province Punjab in Pakistan.

History

The name 'Qadirabad' comes from the name of Mirza Qadir Khan, whose grave and that of his brother's grave are in Qadirabad. A wall was built enclosing the village between 1556 and 1605 with three gateways.

The predominantly Muslim population supported Muslim League and Pakistan Movement. After the independence of Pakistan in 1947, the minority Hindus and Sikhs migrated to India while the Muslims refugees from India settled down in the Mandi Bahauddin District.

Demographics
The population of Qadirabad was calculated to be 17,255 in 2014 (10,186 in 1998).

Geography
The Chenab River is less than five kilometres to the south of Qadirabad. The nearest cities are Phalia, about 20 kilometres away, Mandi Bahauddin, about 40 kilometres away, and Gujrat, about 70 kilometres away. Sialkot International Airport is about 115 km from Qadirabad. Sargodha from Qadirabad through Bhalwal is ~ 98 kilometres and through Sial More is about 105 km. Faisalabad through motorway M-3 is ~ 165 km . Allama Iqbal International Airport Lahore from Qadirabad is ~210 km through motorway and is ~180 km through Gujranwala. Old Ravi bridge Lahore from Qadirabad is ~ 150 km through Gujranwala and is 185 km through Motorway. Benazir Bhutto International Airport Islamabad/Rawalpindi is ~ 255 km through Motorway, ~ 200 km through Mandi Bahauddin (at night not safe to travel this road) and ~ 230 km through Gujrat (relatively safe to travel at night). Hafizabad is about 65 km through Qadirabad headworks. Aerial distance of Hafizabad from Qadirabad through Vanike Tarar is about 30 km but there is no bridge on the river Chenab in between. If the Chinab river is dry then Hafizabad is about 6 to 7 hours walking distance from Qadirabad. That is reason to give big benefit to the people of Tehsil Phalia/Qadirabad and the people of District Hafizabad, a bridge in between Qadirabad and Vanike Tarar on the River Chenab is recommended to connect the people of two districts more closer. It will also make easier to the people of Tehsil Phalia to travel to Lahore through Motorway.

Transport
The nearest railway station is located at Mandi Bahauddin. The nearest international airports are located at Lahore, Faisalabad, Sialkot and Islamabad, which are each about three to four hours drive away. The main roads lead from Qadirabad to Malakwal; Mandi Bahauddin via Phalia; Mandi Bahauddin via Kathalan Sheikhan; Gujrat via Phalia; and Gujrat via Jokalian.

Notable individuals
The following are some of the important personalities of Qadirabad.
Adv Abdul Wahhab
 Rana Muhammad Gulzar Former ex M.N.A (deceased)
 Late Chaudhry Fazal Hussain Gujjar (Chairman and Nazim City Qadirabad)
 Captain Asad Talha Mohsin Gujjar
 Chaudhry Muhammad Ashraf Arain (Chairman) Qadirabad
 Chaudhry Jameel Ahmed Gujjar (Ex Nazim union council)
 Gul Nawaz Khan Gujjar (Bar at law)
 Ansar Mahmood (Advocate)
 Dr. Saeed Gujjar (M.BBS)
 Dr. Usman Naseer (M.BBS)
 Veterinary Dr. Jamshed Ali
 Chaudhry Abdul Rauf Gujjar (M.Sc.I.T)
 Hakim Shahid Anjum
 Master Gulzar Ahmad Mirza
 Ustad Hafiz Fateh Mohammad
 Mahmood Sahib (Master)
 Yusuf Khan Sahib
 Ch Muhammad Mustafa(SS.T)
 Master Younis Gujjar
 Rizwan Bashir Agha (T.R.O)
 Nazir Ahmad Shahya Gujjar
 Aqib Nazir Kassana
 Javed Akhtar Gujjar.
 Khalid Mohsin Gujjar (Advocate)  
 Ch Khuram Mohsin Gujjar (Advocate)
 M.Meelad Hassan (Rehmani)

References

Villages in Phalia Tehsil
Villages in Mandi Bahauddin District
Union councils of Mandi Bahauddin District